Hélie Marie Auguste Jacques Bertrand Philippe de Noailles, 10th Duke of Noailles (born 16 July 1943, in Boulogne-Billancourt), simply known as Hélie de Noailles, is a French nobleman, diplomat and trade representative. He was styled with the courtesy title duc d'Ayen (Duke of Ayen) from 1953 till 2009, and currently with the French title duc de Noailles (Duke of Noailles).

Early life and education
Hélie de Noailles was born in Boulogne-Billancourt as the only son and child of François de Noailles, 9th Duke of Noailles, and Charlotte de Caumont La Force.

After studying at the private catholic school Cours Hattemer, 52, Rue de Londres in Paris, he subsequently obtained a Licentiate in Law from the Paris Law Faculty of the University of Paris, and a diploma from the Institut d'Études Politiques de Paris in 1967, before going on to the École nationale d'administration where he graduated in 1969.

Career
He began his career in the diplomacy and he served with the economic cooperation group of the Minister of Foreign Affairs (1969–1972).

After a short passage to the cabinet of the Prime Minister in the capacity as operations manager in 1972, de Noailles entered the Office de Radiodiffusion Télévision Française (ORTF) as a principal private secretary of the general president-directors Arthur Tells then Marceau Long, then of the president of FR 3, Claude Contamine. He then joined, in the capacity as technical adviser, the cabinets of Andre Rossi, Minister for the Foreign trade (1976–1978), then of Jean-François Deniau, Minister for the Foreign trade (1978–1981), then Minister for Administrative reforms (1981).

The 1981 general election returned him to the Quay d'Orsay, where de Noailles became the second adviser of the French Embassy to the United States (1982–1986). On his return to France, he became director of the development of the Perrodo group (1986–1988), then general president-director of Kelt Énergie France (1988–1992), and finally director at the Maison Lazard and Co (1990–1996). (related to Lazard).

De Noailles chaired the French Sons of the American Revolution, Société française des Fils de la Révolution Américaine, and since 2001, he has been mayor of the commune of Épinay-Champlâtreux, succeeding his father, who was mayor from 1932 to 2001.

Personal life
On 11 March 1972, de Noailles married Cécile Nadèje Marie Paule Gonin (born 25 November 1945, Boulogne-Billancourt) at Épinay-Champlâtreux. Together they have three children, two daughters and one son: 
 Julie Marie-Christine Françoise (b. Boulogne-Billancourt 11 July 1972)
 Marie-Alicia Eugénie Charlotte Blandine (b. Boulogne-Billancourt 8 May 1975)
 Emmanuel Paul Louis Marie, Duke of Ayen (b. Washington 14 February 1983).

As heir apparent of the Dukedom of Noailles he was styled with the title Duke of Ayen between 1953 till 2009. At the death of his father in 2009, he became the 10th Duke of Noailles.

Hélie de Noailles is a Knight (Chevalier) of the National Order of Merit (Ordre national du Mérite) of France.

Ancestry

References

Further reading
 Who's Who in France, edition 2002–2003, Levallois-Perret, Editions Jacques Lafitte

External links
Hélie de Noailles, 10th Duke of Noailles

Noailles, Helie Marie Auguste Jacques Bertrand Philippe, 10th duc de
French diplomats
Helie Marie Auguste Jacques Bertrand Philippe
Helie Marie Auguste Jacques Bertrand Philippe
Helie
Noailles, Helie Marie Auguste Jacques Bertrand Philippe, 10th duc de